Laszlo Antal (1936–2010) was a Hungarian born sports shooter who competed for Great Britain and England.

Shooting career
Antal represented Great Britain in the 1976 Summer Olympics. He represented England and won a bronze medal in the 50 metres free pistol, at the 1974 British Commonwealth Games in Christchurch, New Zealand.

References

1936 births
2010 deaths
British male sport shooters
Hungarian male sport shooters
Shooters at the 1974 British Commonwealth Games
Olympic shooters of Great Britain
Shooters at the 1976 Summer Olympics
Commonwealth Games bronze medallists for England
Commonwealth Games medallists in shooting
Medallists at the 1974 British Commonwealth Games